Fadei Nagacevschi (born 30 December 1982) is a Moldovan politician. He served as Minister of Justice from 14 November 2019 to 5 August 2021 in the cabinet of Prime Minister Ion Chicu.

He previously served as advisor to the President of Parliament of the Republic of Moldova.

He has a bachelor's degree and master's degree in law from Moldova State University.

References 

Living people
1982 births
Place of birth missing (living people)
Moldovan Ministers of Justice
21st-century Moldovan politicians
Moldova State University alumni
Party of Socialists of the Republic of Moldova politicians